Gili Bar-Hillel Semo (born Gili Bar-Hillel in 1974) is an English-Hebrew translator from Israel, best known for translating the Harry Potter series into Hebrew.

Biography
Bar-Hillel is the daughter of Maya Bar-Hillel, a professor of psychology at the Hebrew University, and the granddaughter of philosopher and linguist Yehoshua Bar-Hillel. Her mother frequently lectured in the United States and as a result she spent a lot of time there as a child, learning to read English before Hebrew.

Bar-Hillel studied at Hebrew University, Tel Aviv University, and Harvard University, and received a Bachelor of Arts in dramatic writing and dramaturgy. She lives and works in Tel Aviv, and is married with three children.

Career
Before translating the Harry Potter series, Bar-Hillel was editor of children's books for the Israeli publishing house Keter, worked for the major Israeli newspaper Haaretz, directed plays, and produced radio programs. She is a member of the International Wizard of Oz Club and has been from before she translated the Harry Potter series. She has also translated books by Jacqueline Wilson, Diana Wynne Jones and Noel Streatfeild, and adapted an annotated edition of The Wizard of Oz for Hebrew readers. As well, she also reviewed picture books for the Israeli women's weekly LaIsha for several years. In 2012 Bar-Hillel founded Utz Publishing, where to this day she continues working as owner and editor in chief.

Harry Potter series
Bar-Hillel began translating the series in 1999, starting with Harry Potter and the Philosopher's Stone. Since the success of the series, Bar-Hillel has been described as a "bona fide Israeli celebrity" with a "nationwide" reputation. Because of the enormous popularity of Harry Potter, her work has come under close scrutiny by the Israeli public, especially for any deviations from the original text. The translation process was made more difficult by not knowing how the plot would develop in later books, the gender of certain characters, and the problem of how to translate various issues that are not necessarily cross-cultural, such as references to food and religion.

When the seventh book was released, Bar-Hillel flew to London ahead of the book's launch, purchased a copy and read it on the plane back to Israel.

At the Jerusalem International Book Fair in 2007, a large audience gathered to hear her talk about the translation process, with fans elbowing their way in for autographs and photos. She told reporters: "It's ridiculous, this is something that never happens to translators. The attention I've received is because I'm translating Harry Potter. It's Harry, not me".

Translated books

Harry Potter series by J. K. Rowling
 Harry Potter and the Philosopher's Stone
 Harry Potter and the Chamber of Secrets
 Harry Potter and the Prisoner of Azkaban
 Harry Potter and the Goblet of Fire
 Harry Potter and the Order of the Phoenix
 Harry Potter and the Half-Blood Prince
 Harry Potter and the Deathly Hallows
 Fantastic Beasts and Where to Find Them (A part of the Harry Potter series)
 Quidditch Through the Ages (A part of the Harry Potter series)
 The Tales of Beedle the Bard (A part of the Harry Potter series)
 Harry Potter and the Cursed Child (A part of the Harry Potter series)

Other books (partial list):
 Howl's Moving Castle by Diana Wynne Jones
 Double Act by Jacqueline Wilson
 Ballet Shoes by Noel Streatfeild
 The Annotated Wizard of Oz by L. Frank Baum, annotated by Michael Patrick Hearn
 Peter and Wendy and Peter Pan in Kensington Gardens by J.M. Barrie: translated and added Hebrew annotations
 Predictably Irrational by Dan Ariely
 Misbehaving by Richard Thaler
 Cakes in Space by Philip Reeve and Sarah McIntyre
 Don't Let the Pigeon Drive the Bus! by Mo Willems
 Utterly Me, Clarice Bean by Lauren Child
 The Hundred and One Dalmatians by Dodie Smith
 Mary Poppins by P. L. Travers
 Goblin Market by Christina Rossetti
 Nimona by N.D. Stevenson

Awards
Bar-Hillel received a Geffen Award for her translation of Harry Potter and the Deathly Hallows:
 Best Translation of a SF&F book (2008): Gili Bar-Hillel Semo for Translating the book: Harry Potter and the Deathly Hallows by J.K. Rowling, published by Yedioth Books.

Books translated by Bar-Hillel have won several Geffen awards:
 2008: Harry Potter and the Deathly Hallows by J. K. Rowling, translated by Gili Bar-Hillel, published by Yedioth Books.
 2015: Ozma of Oz and Dorothy and the Wizard in Oz by L. Frank Baum
 2017: Harry Potter and the Cursed Child play script

References

External links
Gili Bar-Hillel's blog 
Biography and booklist, Ohio State University 
Utz Publishing website 

1974 births
English–Hebrew translators
Harry Potter in translation
Harvard University alumni
Hebrew University of Jerusalem alumni
Israeli Jews
Israeli people of Austrian-Jewish descent
Israeli translators
Living people
Literary translators